Karama Has No Walls is a 2013 documentary film by Sara Ishaq about the Yemen revolution.

References

External links
 
 

2012 films
2012 short documentary films
Yemeni Revolution
Documentary films about the Arab Spring